The Brazilian Journal of Medical and Biological Research is a peer-reviewed open-access scientific journal in the fields of biology and medicine, edited and published monthly by the Associação Brasileira de Divulgação Científica (ABDC), a federation of Brazilian scientific societies comprising:

 Sociedade Brasileira de Biofísica
 Sociedade Brasileira de Farmacologia e Terapêutica Experimental
 Sociedade Brasileira de Fisiologia
 Sociedade Brasileira de Imunologia
 Sociedade Brasileira de Investigação Clínica
 Sociedade Brasileira de Neurociências e Comportamento

It is now published as part of the Scientific Electronic Library (SciELO) project.

History 
The journal was established in 1968 by Michel Jamra as Revista Brasileira de Pesquisas Médicas e Biológicas, published in Portuguese. It obtained its current title in 1981, when ABDC assumed its publication, accepting papers in English only. The initial editors-in-chief were Lewis Joel Greene, Eduardo Moacyr Krieger, and Sérgio Henrique Ferreira (Faculty of Medicine of Ribeirão Preto). Of the original three, only Greene remains as editor.

Abstracting and indexing 
The journal is abstracted and indexed in:

References

External links 
 

Biology journals
General medical journals
Academic journals published by learned and professional societies of Brazil